Carlos Andrés Villanueva Rolland (born 5 February 1986) is a Chilean football player who is currently playing for Magallanes in the Primera B de Chile.

Club career

Audax Italiano
In the Copa Libertadores 2007, the left-footed playmaker was the hub of Audax Italiano. The team was not able to qualify for the knockout phase due to goal differential. Villanueva was rewarded with a call-up to Chile's Copa América 2007 squad.

Blackburn Rovers
On 17 July 2008, it was confirmed by Villanueva's agents and also former club that Villanueva would play for the Blackburn Rovers of the Premier League in England. He also confirmed this on 29 July, pending a work permit being issued.

On 2 August, Villanueva completed his season-long loan move to Blackburn. The club had the option to make the deal permanent, at a pre-agreed fee. Villanueva also agreed terms to extend his contract for a further three years, if the option is exercised.

On 27 August, Villanueva made his debut for Blackburn in a League Cup game against Grimsby Town, a match in which he scored his first goal for the club. He also set up a goal for striker Matt Derbyshire in the 4–1 win. His debut was delayed by a few weeks due to the virus, chicken pox which forced him to stay away from club training facilities, so that he did not pass on the virus to other staff.

On 20 September, Villanueva made his (home) debut in the Premier League as a late second-half substitute against Fulham, his impact was immediate and substantial. Linking up well to provide a looping cross for Roque Santa Cruz to head down for the winning goal, which was converted by Derbyshire.

He made his full starting Premier League debut on 27 September, against Newcastle United at St. James' Park, getting an assist providing a cross for a headed goal for Christopher Samba.

On 5 January 2009, he scored a free kick against Blyth Spartans in the FA Cup giving his team the lead, and on 4 February he assisted two goals against Sunderland in the FA Cup. On 11 April, he played in the Premier League for the first time since Sam Allardyce took charge of Blackburn.

Al-Shabab
On 15 May 2009, Audax Italiano Villanueva signed for Al Shabab, the Emirati club paid Audax about $5 million. Although he publicly stated he wished to have stayed at Blackburn and tried to established himself in one of the worlds top leagues.

Universidad Católica
On 4 February 2013, Al Shabab confirms that Villanueva will play on loan at Universidad Católica until 31 May.

Al-Ittihad
On 15 July 2016, Villanueva joined Al Ittihad, in the Saudi Professional League.

Magallanes
In June 2022, Villanueva rescinded his contract with Palestino and moved to Primera B club Magallanes.

International career
Villanueva represented Chile U17 at the 2003 South American U-17 Championship and Chile U20 at the 2005 South American U-20 Championship.

He was also capped for the senior squad and played for Chile in the Copa América 2007, where he scored a superb free kick goal against Ecuador on his first official game with the senior squad. He is also credited with an assist during Chile's qualifier game at Uruguay. However, he was not called up to the 30-man preliminary squad for Chile for the South Africa World Cup.

International goals

Personal life
The Villanueva family has a close friendship with the footballer Luis Jiménez's family. In addition to the fact that Villanueva coincided with Jiménez in Al-Ittihad, Jiménez and his wife, María José, are the godparents of the Villanueva's son as well as Villanueva and his wife are the godparents of the Jiménez's children.

Honours

Club 

Al-Ittihad
 Crown Prince Cup: 2016–17
 King Cup: 2018

Individual

Saudi Professional League Player of the Season: 2017–18
King Cup Top goalscorer: 2018

References

External links
 
 
 

1986 births
Sportspeople from Viña del Mar
Living people
Chilean people of French descent
Association football midfielders
Chilean footballers
Chile international footballers
Chile youth international footballers
Chile under-20 international footballers
Chilean expatriate footballers
Deportes La Serena footballers
Audax Italiano footballers
Blackburn Rovers F.C. players
Al Shabab Al Arabi Club Dubai players
Club Deportivo Universidad Católica footballers
Ittihad FC players
Al-Fayha FC players
Club Deportivo Palestino footballers
Deportes Magallanes footballers
Magallanes footballers
Chilean Primera División players
Premier League players
UAE Pro League players
Saudi Professional League players
Primera B de Chile players
2007 Copa América players
Expatriate footballers in England
Chilean expatriate sportspeople in England
Expatriate footballers in the United Arab Emirates
Chilean expatriate sportspeople in the United Arab Emirates
Expatriate footballers in Saudi Arabia
Chilean expatriate sportspeople in Saudi Arabia